Burma competed at the 1956 Summer Olympics in Melbourne, Australia.

Athletics

Men
Track & road events

Boxing

Men

Sailing

Open

Weightlifting

Men

References
Official Olympic Reports

Nations at the 1956 Summer Olympics
1956
1956 in Burmese sport